Specim, Spectral Imaging Ltd is a European technology firm headquartered in Oulu, Finland. Specim manufactures and sells imaging spectrographs, hyperspectral cameras and systems. Specim's airborne AISA hyperspectral cameras have been utilized for example in monitoring the environmental effects of major industrial catastrophes such as Deepwater Horizon oil spill and Red mud spill.

In 2010, Specim was widely credited for its Thermal Infrared Hyperspectral Cameras, including a position as a Prism Awards for Photonics Innovation finalist.  The credited Specim Owl is world's first Thermal Hyperspectral Camera that can efficiently be used for outdoor surveillance and UAV applications without an external light source such as the Sun or the Moon.

In 2013, together with Germany’s Forschungszentrum Jülich research centre, Specim developed and thoroughly tested the novel Hyplant airborne hyperspectral sensor. This was the first airborne sensor to map the fluorescence over large areas. Since then it has been used to map various types of vegetation all over Europe and also in the USA. This project is one step in assessing feasibility of possible new ESA satellite instrument that could provide global maps of vegetation fluorescence called the Fluorescence Explorer (FLEX).

References

Companies based in Oulu
Remote sensing
Companies established in 1995
Spectroscopy
Infrared imaging